The 1924 Northern Illinois State Teachers football team represented Northern Illinois State Teachers College in the 1924 college football season. The team competed in the Illinois Intercollegiate Athletic Conference, which was also known as the Little Nineteen. They were led by second-year head coach William Muir and played their home games at Glidden Field, located on the east end of campus. The Teachers finished the season with a 4–4 record and an 1–3 record in conference play. Pete Ball was the team's captain.

Schedule

References

Northern Illinois State
Northern Illinois Huskies football seasons
Northern Illinois State Teachers football